Kurt Adams may refer to:

Sportsmen
Kurt Adams (Canadian football) (born 1987)
Curt Adams, footballer in 2005 Caribbean Cup

Others
Kurt Adams (politician) (1889–1944), German politician
'Kurt Adams', a pseudonym used by Jimmy Van Heusen in the authorship of the song "Somewhere Along the Way"

See also
Curtis Adams (disambiguation)